The Saint Vincent and the Grenadines women's national basketball team represents Saint Vincent and the Grenadines in international competitions. It is administrated by the St. Vincent and the Grenadines Basketball Association.

References

External links
Presentation at CaribbeanBasketball.com
Archived records of Saint Vincent and the Grenadines team participations
St. Vincent and the Grenadines Basketball Association  - Facebook Presentation

Women's national basketball teams
Basketball
Basketball in Saint Vincent and the Grenadines